"What It Is" is a song written and recorded by the British rock musician Mark Knopfler. It was released on 4 September 2000 as the lead single from his second solo studio album, Sailing to Philadelphia (2000).

An extended version of the song released in Mexico contains an additional verse:
And the highwayman stands blowing on his fingers by the green
I've walked inside his shoes before so I always buy his magazine
He's with a local mystery with blood stains on her hands
I like the way she winks at me but I leave her with the highwayman

The song's lyrics pay homage to the city of Edinburgh, Scotland.

Track listing

Charts

References

2000 singles
Mark Knopfler songs
Songs written by Mark Knopfler
2000 songs